Timothy or Tim Young may refer to:
Tim Young (basketball) (born 1976), American basketball player
Tim Young (ice hockey) (born 1955), Canadian ice hockey forward
Tim Young (baseball) (born 1973), American baseball pitcher
Tim Young (American rower) (born 1969), American rower
Tim Young (Australian rower) (born 1956), Australian rower
Timothy R. Young (1811–1898), U.S. Representative from Illinois
Timothy Young (Saw), a character in the Saw films